Lars Harms (born 8 November 1964 in Husum) is a German politician from the South Schleswig Voters' Association.

He has been a member of the Landtag of Schleswig-Holstein since 2000.

References 

1964 births
Living people
Danish minority of Southern Schleswig

South Schleswig Voters' Association politicians
21st-century German politicians
Members of the Landtag of Schleswig-Holstein